The Skyline Trail is a hiking trail in Jasper National Park, Alberta, Canada. It is known for its views, with much of the hike being located above the tree line. It is also known for its challenging weather conditions above the tree line, which can be a problem for hikers, who can lose sight of trails.

The trail is recognized as one of the best backpacking trails in Jasper, and it is the one of the busiest in the Rockies. With 25 km of the total 44.1 km being at or above the tree line, it has views of the surrounding mountains and valley. It is normally hiked in two days from Maligne Lake to the bottom of Signal Mountain, but it may be completed at a more moderate pace, over three or four days. It is recommended to hike the trail south to north from Maligne Lake, as the fire road descending to Signal Mountain on the northern end is an 800m elevation loss. There are three challenging passes to conquer, including the highest section of trail in Jasper National Park.

There are six campgrounds, located at 5 km, 8 km, 12 km, 19 km, 30 km, and 35 km (Evelyn Creek, Little Shovel, Snowbowl, Curator, Tekarra, and Signal, respectively). The campgrounds provide tent pads, picnic tables, bear poles with metal cables, connectors, and toilets. Skyline Trail is a no-fire zone. Camping is only permitted with reservations at the designated campgrounds.

Route
There are two main ways to enter the Skyline Trail. The majority of visitors opt for the main trail; from the parking lot at Maligne Lake, the hike begins with a gentle walk through the forest past Lorraine and Mona Lakes, before crossing the Evelyn Creek bridge to the campground. The second option, adding 4 km and 500 m of elevation gain, is to climb the Bald Hills by using a well-established short cut for a view of Maligne Lake before heading down the fire road and joining the trail to the Evelyn Creek bridge.

Evelyn Creek campground is a camping spot in the forest adjacent to the creek, but it is recommended that it be passed over for campgrounds at higher elevations, following Evelyn Creek Campground the trail climbs to Little Shovel Pass. Because the campground after Little Shovel, Snowbowl, is heavily used, if possible Little Shovel Campground is an option for an overnight stay, especially as it is situated part way up Little Shovel Pass so it offers a respite from the steady climb. From Little Shovel Campground, the trail breaks out of the trees into the upper subalpine, continuing its climb to Little Shovel Pass at 10 km. Entering the Snowbowl, the Skyline Trail can be seen meandering through open meadows until it enters the trees wherein the Snowbowl Campground is sheltered.

Snowbowl is as popular in winter as it is in summer, and it contains a small cabin called Shangrila, built by guide, Donald "Curly" Phillips, in 1936 for skiing enthusiasts. The cabin, administered by the Maligne Lake Ski Club, is not available to summer hikers.

From Snowbowl Campground, the ascent rises through flower-filled meadows to Little Shovel Pass at 17 km.

Crossing into the Curator Basin, the trail swings right, past the junction with the Watchtower Trail. A 4 km descent into this valley leads to the Watchtower Campground, an option as Curator Campground is heavily used and often fully booked.

Returning to the trail section in the Curator Basin, the Skyline Trail continues to the Wabasso Creek Trail junction at 19 km. Less than 1 km further along this trail is Curator Campground. A little further still is Shovel Pass Lodge, which does allow use by hikers; more frequently, however, horse trips use this lodge as a waypoint. Both the Watchtower and Wabasso trails are good foul weather escape routes off the Skyline, which as mentioned can be necessary as the weather along the Skyline Trail can be treacherous. Beyond the Wabasso junction the Skyline Trail passes Curator Lake then makes a sudden, steep ascent to the Notch at 22 km the highest point on the Skyline at 2511m.

The next 4 km of the trail are along the crest of the Maligne Range, which is exposed to both mountain views and to mountain weather. The descent to Tekarra Campground follows a trail through rocky valley with Mount Tekarra on the left and Excelsior on the right. Centre Mountain dominates the head of the valley, lending its name to the creek and lakes below. Following Lower Centre Lake, the trail enters Tekarra Campground at 30 km. From Tekarra Campground, the trail crosses Centre Creek and borders the shoulders of Tekarra and Signal Mountains to the junction with the Signal Mountain Fire Road. The fire road climbs uphill for 1 km to the old Signal Mountain fire lookout site, which is recommended if time and energy allow. Descending to the right, the fire road passes the junction into Signal Campground, then quickly descends further into the forest for the final leg of the trip. 800m of vertical are surrendered over the final 9 km.

Wildlife
The Skyline Trail is the home range of mammalian species that stand today as icons inhabiting the mountain wilderness or near this area of the park which are the timber wolf, black bear, coyote, grizzly bear, moose, white-tailed deer, bighorn sheep, marten, pika, mountain goat, lynx, marmot, mule deer, porcupine, beaver, elk, wolverine, and cougar. Raptors that inhabit in the trail's forest are great grey owls, golden eagles, great horned owls, and bald eagles.

The trail is recognized as critical woodland caribou habitat. The Boreal woodland Caribou is a threatened Species-at-Risk in Canada. In an attempt to reduce stressors, Parks Canada has banned dogs from all Caribou habitat in Jasper National Park.

History
In 1911 Jack Otto guided Mary Schäffer to Little Shovel Pass on the way to her survey of Maligne Lake. Their party found the way blocked by snow and dug their way through the pass using shovels fashioned from trees. The shovels were left behind and Mary named the pass "Shovel Pass." The shovels are now displayed at the museum in Jasper.

References

Hiking trails in Alberta
Jasper National Park